{{Infobox company|
| name = Nissan North America, Inc.
| logo = File:Nissan_2020_logo.svg
| image = 
| image_caption = 
| type = Subsidiary
| key_people = Mike Colleran, Senior vice-presidentJeremie Papin, Chairman
| foundation = ; in Gardena, California, U.S.
| location = One Nissan Way, Franklin, Tennessee, 37067, U.S.
| area_served = North America
| products = Nissan, Infiniti and Nismo product brands in the United States
| num_employees = 21,000 (including 16,000 manufacturing employees)
| parent = Nissan Motor Corporation
| subsid = {{Collapsible list
  | title=List
  | Sales and service:
  | Nissan Canada, Inc.
  | Nissan Mexicana, S.A. De C.V.
  | Design and Research and Development:
  | Nissan Technical Center North America
  | Nissan Technical Center North America - Mexico
  | Nissan Design America
  | Manufacturing facilities:
  | Nissan North America, Inc. - U.S. Manufacturing
  | Nissan Mexicana, S.A. De C.V. (Manufacturing)
  | ''Finance:  | Nissan Canada Inc. (Finance division)
  | Nissan Motor Acceptance Corp. 
  | NR Finance Mexico, S.A. de C.V. SOFOM ER
  }}
| website = Nissan USAInfiniti USA
}}Nissan North America, Inc., doing business as Nissan USA''', is the North American headquarters, and a wholly owned subsidiary of Nissan Motor Corporation of Japan. The company manufactures and sells Nissan and Infiniti brand cars, sport utility vehicles and pickup trucks through a network of approximately 1,082 Nissan and 211 Infiniti dealers in the United States, including 187 independent Nissan dealerships, 38 Infiniti retailers and 45 Nissan Commercial Vehicle dealers in Canada. The Tennessee location is Nissan's second headquarter office after leaving Gardena, California in 2005, having occupied the location for nearly 50 years.

Alliance 
 Renault–Nissan–Mitsubishi Alliance

Holdings

Sales and service 
 Nissan Canada, Inc.
 Nissan North America, Inc. (National headquarters)
 Nissan Mexicana, S.A. De C. V. (Operational support)

Research and Development 
 Nissan North America, Inc. (Nissan Technical Center North America)
 Nissan North America, Inc. (Nissan Technical Center North America - Mexico)
 Nissan North America, Inc. (Nissan Research Center - Silicon Valley)

Design 
 Nissan North America, Inc. (Nissan Design America)

Manufacturing 
 Nissan North America, Inc. - U.S. Manufacturing (Smyrna)
 Nissan North America, Inc. - U.S. Manufacturing (Canton)
 Nissan North America, Inc. - U.S. Manufacturing (Battery Plant)
 Nissan North America, Inc. - U.S. Manufacturing (Decherd)
 Nissan North America, Inc. (Infiniti Powertrain Plant - Decherd)
 Nissan Mexicana, S.A. De C.V. (Cuernavaca)
 Nissan Mexicana, S.A. De C.V. (Aguascalientes 1 Plant)
 Nissan Mexicana, S.A. De C.V. (Aguascalientes 2 Plant)
 Nissan Mexicana, S.A. De C.V. (Nissan Powertrain Plant)

Finance 
 Nissan Canada Inc. (Finance division)
 Nissan Motor Acceptance Corp. (Franklin)
 Nissan Motor Acceptance Corp. (Irving)
 NR Finance Mexico, S.A. de C.V. SOFOM ER

Brands

Nissan

Current Nissan products 
The following is a list of Nissan models are currently available in the North American market
 Altima
 Armada
 Ariya
 GT-R
 Frontier
 Kicks
 LEAF
 Maxima
 Murano
 Pathfinder
 Rogue
 Rogue Sport
 Sentra
 Titan/Titan XD
 Versa

Former Nissan products
 240SX
 300ZX 
 350Z 
 370Z
 Cube
 Juke
 Murano CrossCabriolet
 NV
 NV200
 Quest
 Stanza
 Xterra

Infiniti

Current Infiniti products 
The following is a list of Infiniti models are currently available in the North American market:

Q50 (Q50 3.0t Luxe, 3.0t Sensory, Red Sport 400)
Q60 (Q60 3.0t Pure, 3.0t Luxe, Red Sport 400)

QX50 
QX55
QX60 (3.5)
QX80 (SUV)

Former Infiniti products 
EX35 and EX37 (SUV)
FX35, FX37, FX45, and FX50 (SUV)
G20 (sedan) P10/P11
G25, G35, and G37 (sedan) V35/V36
G35 and G37 (coupe and convertible) V35/V36
I30 and I35 (sedan)
J30 (sedan)
M30 (coupe and convertible) 
M35/M45 (sedan)
Q30 (hatchback) 
QX30 (Base, Luxury, Premium, and Sport)
Q40 (sedan)
Q45 (sedan)
Q70/Q70L (sedan) 
QX4 (SUV)
QX56 (SUV)
QX70 (3.7, 3.7 AWD, 5.0 AWD)

References

External links 
 Nissan USA
 Infiniti USA

Nissan
American subsidiaries of foreign companies
Vehicle manufacturing companies established in 1960
Companies based in Franklin, Tennessee